Ryan Santiago (born May 25, 1994), known professionally as Royal & the Serpent, is an American singer and songwriter.

Early life
A New Jersey native, Ryan Santiago was born on May 25, 1994. Santiago took up competitive dance as a child, until she "shattered both [her] heel plates" after jumping off a stage while performing when she was 14 years old. She subsequently delved into musical theater. In her teenage years, Santiago learned how to play the guitar and began writing songs.

Career
At the age of 18, Santiago moved to Los Angeles, where she worked as a bartender in a restaurant. She has credited encouragement from a co-worker, who later became her first manager, for motivating her to pursue a professional career as a musician.

In 2017, Santiago independently released "Temperance", her debut single under the stage name Royal & the Serpent. On her moniker, she has explained that "'Royal & the Serpent' translates to 'Me + My Ego'". In 2018, she released her second single, "Together", and was featured on the song "Wicked" by music producer Tommee Profitt. By the end of 2019, she had signed with Atlantic Records.

"Overwhelmed", Royal & the Serpent's first single on Atlantic, was released in June 2020, and her debut EP Get a Grip was released in October. That year, she joined English singer Yungblud's Weird Time of Life virtual tour as a supporting act. Royal & the Serpent's second EP Searching for Nirvana was released in June 2021. In January 2022, she featured as a guest vocalist on "pity party" by Stand Atlantic. Her third EP, IF I DIED WOULD ANYONE CARE, was released on January 28, 2022.

Discography

Singles

As featured artist

References

External links
 

1994 births
Living people
21st-century American singers
21st-century American women singers
American women singer-songwriters
Singer-songwriters from New Jersey
American indie pop musicians
Electropop musicians
American women in electronic music
Atlantic Records artists